The Boston mayoral election of 1905 took place on Tuesday, December 12, 1905. Democratic nominee John F. Fitzgerald defeated Republican nominee Louis A. Frothingham and four other contenders to win election to his first term as Mayor of Boston. Ahead of the general election, primary elections had been held on Thursday, November 16, 1905.

Daniel A. Whelton, who had become acting mayor upon the death of Mayor Patrick Collins in September 1905, did not run for the position.

Fitzgerald was inaugurated on Monday, January 1, 1906.

Results

Democratic primary
 Edward J. Donovan, Boston City Clerk
 John F. Fitzgerald, former member of the United States House of Representatives (1895–1901) and the Massachusetts Senate (1892–1894)

Republican primary
 Louis A. Frothingham, Speaker of the Massachusetts House of Representatives
 Henry S. Dewey, former Boston Municipal Court judge
 Edward B. Callender, member of the Massachusetts Senate
Withdrew
 Edward J. Bromberg, Boston Alderman
Sources:

Other candidates
 Henry S. Dewey, who had narrowly lost the Republican primary election, ran as People's Party candidate
 Michael D. Fitzgerald, Socialist Labor candidate, was removed from the ballot in early December due to invalid signatures
 George G. Hall, was the Socialist candidate
 James A. Watson, was the Municipal Ownership League candidate

General election

See also
List of mayors of Boston, Massachusetts

References

Further reading
 

1905
Boston
Boston mayoral
1900s in Boston